Joffre is a census-designated place located in Smith Township, Washington County in the state of Pennsylvania.  The community is located in northern Washington County about 3 miles east of the borough of Burgettstown.  As of the 2010 census the population was 536 residents.

Demographics

References

Census-designated places in Washington County, Pennsylvania
Census-designated places in Pennsylvania